Bortoluzzi is an Italian surname. Notable people with the surname include:

Diego Bortoluzzi (born 1966), Italian footballer and manager
Ferruccio Bortoluzzi (1920–2007), Italian painter and sculptor
Jérôme Bortoluzzi (born 1982), French hammer thrower
Marinella Bortoluzzi (born 1939), Italian high jumper
Roberto Bortoluzzi (1921–2007), Italian sports journalist and radio broadcaster

Italian-language surnames